Annastasia Raj (born 26 July 1975) is a Malaysian racewalker. She competed in the women's 10 kilometres walk at the 1996 Summer Olympics.

References

External links
 

1975 births
Living people
Athletes (track and field) at the 1996 Summer Olympics
Malaysian female racewalkers
Olympic athletes of Malaysia
Place of birth missing (living people)